The 2009 Nagoya Grampus season is Nagoya Grampus's 17th season in the J. League Division 1 and 28th overall in the Japanese top flight. They competed in the 2009 J. League Cup, 2009 Emperor's Cup, and the 2009 AFC Champions League.

Squad

name

Transfers

Winter

In:

Out:

Summer

In:

Out:

Competitions

J. League

Results summary

Results by round

Results

League table

J. League Cup

Emperor's Cup

AFC Champions League

Group stage

Knockout stage

Round of 16

Quarter-final

Semi-final

Player statistics

Appearances and goals

|-
|colspan="14"|Players who appeared for Nagoya Grampus, but left during the season:

|}

Goal Scorers

Disciplinary Record

References

External links
 J. League official site

Nagoya Grampus
Nagoya Grampus seasons